Sernaglia della Battaglia is a comune (municipality) in the Province of Treviso in the Italian region Veneto, located about  northwest of Venice and about  northwest of Treviso.

Sernaglia della Battaglia borders the following municipalities: Farra di Soligo, Giavera del Montello, Moriago della Battaglia, Nervesa della Battaglia, Pieve di Soligo, Susegana, Volpago del Montello.

References

Cities and towns in Veneto